Hasbro Reconstruction was a 2016 comic book launch by IDW Publishing about its line of comic books based on properties of the toy company Hasbro. Since June 2016, this branding converged most of IDW's Hasbro comics into the Hasbro Comic Book Universe, using the end of Revolution as its launching pod, which then continued with First Strike. For November 2018, IDW concluded the branding.

Background
The Hasbro Reconstruction branding serves to converge IDW's own versions of Transformers and G.I. Joe into a shared universe of characters from various Hasbro brands, which had started with Simon Furman and E. J. Su's The Transformers: Infiltration in October 19, 2005. Rom and Micronauts reappeared on 2016 after Hasbro regained their comic book rights from Marvel Comics. Action Man and M.A.S.K. were the last additions for the event series Revolution. Between 2017 and 2018, the characters of Visionaries debuted on the aftermath of the event series First Strike. The Reconstruction branding concluded with the Transformers: Unicron miniseries.

Titles

Ongoing series

One-shots

See also 
 List of comics based on Hasbro properties

References 

IDW Publishing
Comic book reboots
Hasbro
2016 comics debuts
2018 comics endings
Action Man
G.I. Joe comics
Rom the Space Knight
Science fiction comics
Transformers comics